Ebba Larsdotter Sparre (1629 – 19 March 1662) was a Swedish lady-in-waiting and noblewoman. She is known as the intimate friend and possible lover of Queen Christina of Sweden.

Life
Ebba Sparre was the daughter of statesman and marshal Lars Eriksson Sparre and Märta Banér and grandchild of chancellor Erik Larsson Sparre. She arrived at court in 1644, where she was appointed hovfröken (maid of honour) to the queen.

Sparre was a celebrated beauty at the royal court and nicknamed La belle comtesse. She frequently played the part of Venus in the amateur ballets performed by the nobility at court. Her intimate relationship with Queen Christina gave rise to the speculation that they were lovers. This has been widely accepted by historians, who look to Christina's attitude and interactions with Sparre as proof of her sexuality. However, besides Sparre and a few other ladies of the court, notably Lady Jane Ruthven and Louise van der Nooth, Queen Christina did not show any interest in her female courtiers, and generally mentions them only to express contempt over their femininity and portray herself as more masculine than them. In 1639 she mentions her attitude toward her ladies in waiting in regard to Beata Oxenstierna and her daughter, maid of honor Märta Ulfsparre: "The Mistress of the Robes Lady Beata Oxenstierna and her daughter arrived just now. The more of them that comes here the worse it is".

Most of Christina's spare time was spent with "la belle comtesse", and she often called attention to her beauty. She introduced her to the English ambassador Bulstrode Whitelocke as her 'bed-fellow', assuring him that Sparre's intellect was as striking as her body. When Christina left Sweden she continued to write passionate love-letters to Sparre, in which she told her that she would always love her. Such emotional letters were relatively common at that time, and Christina would also use the same style when writing to women she had never met, but whose writings she admired.

Ebba was engaged to Bengt Gabrielsson Oxenstierna but broke the engagement to marry Count Jakob Kasimir de la Gardie, younger brother of the queen's favourite Magnus Gabriel de la Gardie, on the initiative of Christina. They married in 1652. The marriage was unhappy.

Sparre and Christina kept in touch after Christina left Sweden in 1654. In 1661, Christina invited Sparre to visit her in Hamburg, and she also wished to see her during her visit to Sweden in 1660, but this was prevented by Sparre's family.

References 
Wilhelmina Stålberg: Anteqningar om Svenska kvinnor (Notes on Swedish women)

Notes 

1629 births
1662 deaths
17th-century Swedish people
Swedish ladies-in-waiting
Swedish countesses
People of the Swedish Empire
Court of Christina, Queen of Sweden
Sparre family